Annie-Rose Maloney (born 4 March 1989) is an Australian cricketer. A right-arm fast-medium bowler and occasional right-handed batter, she played a single One Day International (ODI) for the Australia women's national  team against India in July 2011.

Cricket career
Maloney played club cricket for Essendon-Maribyrnong, and in November 2007 she was selected to play for Victoria's state team for the first time in a Women's National Cricket League match. Representing Victoria between 2007/08 and 2011/12, Maloney played 15 List A matches in the Women's National Cricket League (WNCL) and 19 T20 matches in the Australian Women's Twenty20 Cup (WT20).

In February 2011, Maloney was included in Australia's squad for the final three matches of the 2010–11 Rose Bowl series. These matches were scheduled to be played that February, but due to the 2011 Christchurch Earthquake the matches were cancelled. The matches were rescheduled to June 2011, but the first match was abandoned without a ball bowled and Maloney did not play in either the second or third match. Maloney ultimately played her first and only One Day International for Australia against India on 2 July 2011. She bowled six overs without taking a wicket and did not bat.

References

External links
 
 Annie Maloney at Cricket Australia

1989 births
Living people
Australian cricketers
Australian women cricketers
Australia women One Day International cricketers
Cricketers from Victoria (Australia)
Sportswomen from Victoria (Australia)
Victoria women cricketers